David Doe (born January 22, 2000) is a Canadian soccer player who plays for South Bend Lions FC in USL League Two.

Club career

FC Edmonton
Doe signed a professional contract with North American Soccer League side FC Edmonton on August 28, 2017. At the end of the season Doe was released from his professional contract after the club suspended its senior team operations for the 2018 season.

Doe spent 2018 with FC Edmonton's U20 Academy, and also played varsity soccer while attending the Northern Alberta Institute of Technology.

On February 15, 2019 Doe re-signed with FC Edmonton ahead of the inaugural Canadian Premier League season.

South Bend Lions FC
In April 2021, Doe signed with USL League Two expansion club South Bend Lions FC.

International career
Doe attended two Canada under-17 evaluation camps in 2016.

Personal life
Doe was born in Monrovia before moving to Edmonton, Alberta with his family at the age of 10.

References

External links

FC Edmonton player profile

2001 births
Living people
Association football forwards
Canadian soccer players
Liberian footballers
Soccer players from Edmonton
Sportspeople from Monrovia
Liberian emigrants to Canada
Naturalized citizens of Canada
FC Edmonton players
North American Soccer League players
Canadian Premier League players
Canadian expatriate sportspeople in the United States
Expatriate soccer players in the United States
Canadian expatriate soccer players